The  59th Technology and Engineering Emmy Awards  was held on January 8, 2008  at the 2008 International Consumer Electronics Show in Las Vegas.

Awardee

The Emmy Awards for ATSC broadcast transmission system RF filters:
 Electronics Research Inc.
 Dielectric Communications
 Harris Broadcast
 Micro Communications Inc.

The Emmy Awards for Development… of interactive Video on Demand infrastructure and signaling, leading to large scale VOD implementations:
 Time Warner Cable
 Scientific Atlanta
 N2 Broadband (Tandberg Television)

The Emmy Award for Coaxial cable technology:
 AT&T

The Emmy Award for Pioneering development of a fully monitored fiber optic based digital network… at shared use sports venues:
 Vyvx Services

The Emmy Award for Development and implementation of an integrated and portable IP-based live, edit and store-and-forward digital newsgathering system:
 CNN

The Emmy Awards for Monitoring for compliance standards for ATSC & DVB transport streams:
 Rohde & Schwarz
 Tektronix
 Thomson
 Pixelmetrix Corporation

The advanced media technology winners for Science, Engineering & Technology for Broadband & Personal Television:

The Awards for Outstanding Achievement in Advanced Media Technology for Best Use of Commercial Advertising on Personal Computer:
 The L Word in Second Life, Showtime Networks/Electric Sheep Company

The Awards for Outstanding Achievement in Advanced Media Technology for Best Use for Creation and Distribution of Interactive Commercial Advertising Delivered Through Digital Set Top Boxes:
 Axe Boost Your E.S.P. Interactive Channel Experience, Brightline iTV/Unilever

The Awards for Outstanding Achievement in Advanced Media Technology for Synchronous Enhancement of Original Television Content for Interactive Use (Two Screen Environment TV /PC or TV / Mobile Device):
 March Madness on Demand, CBSSports.com/CBS Sports

The Awards for Outstanding Achievement in Advanced Media Technology for Creation of Non-Traditional Programs or Platforms:
 MTV's Virtual Laguna Beach, MTV Networks

The Awards for Outstanding Achievement in Advanced Media Technology for Best Use of Personal Media Display and Presentation Technology (PSP, Cell Phone, Personal Media Player, Mobile Devices):
 Bravo To Go, Bravo

The Awards for Outstanding Achievement in Advanced Media Technology for Best Use of "On Demand" (Consumer Scheduled or Programmed) Technology Over Broadband Networks for Active "lean-forward" Viewing:
 MLB Mosaic, Ensequence/MLB.TV

The Awards for Outstanding Achievement in Advanced Media Technology for Best Use of "On Demand" for Passive "lean-backward" Viewing:
 Switched Digital Video: Revolutionizing TV, Time Warner Cable/BigBand Networks

Following are the winners for Engineering & Technology for Creation and Implementation of Video Games and Platforms:

The Awards for Game Controller Innovation:
 Nintendo DS, Nintendo,
 Wii, Nintendo

The Awards for Handheld Game Device Display Screen Innovation:
 Football & Auto Race – Mattel Electronics
 Atari Lynx – Atari Corporation
 Nintendo DS – Nintendo

The Awards for User-Generated Content - Game Modification:
 Pinball Construction Set – Bill Budge & Electronic Arts
 Quake – John Carmack & id Software
 Second Life – Philip Rosedale & Linden Lab

The Award for Physics Engines:
 Havok

The Awards for Development of Massively Multiplayer Online Graphical Role Playing Games (MMORPG):
 Neverwinter Nights – Don Daglow & Stormfront Studios, AOL-Time Warner, Wizards of the Coast,
 EverQuest – Sony Online Entertainment
 World of Warcraft – Mike Morhaime & Blizzard Entertainment

The Awards for Visual Digital Content Creation Tools and their Impact:
 Maya, Autodesk
 3D Studio Max, Autodesk

References

External links

Technology & Engineering Emmy Awards
2007 awards
Technology and Engineering Emmy Awards
January 2008 events in the United States